Varnavas Christofi (born 23 April 1943) is a retired Cypriot football goalkeeper.

References

1943 births
Living people
Cypriot footballers
Nea Salamis Famagusta FC players
Vancouver Royals players
North American Soccer League (1968–1984) players
Olympiakos Nicosia players
Association football goalkeepers
Cypriot First Division players
Cyprus international footballers
Cypriot expatriate footballers
Expatriate soccer players in Canada
Cypriot expatriate sportspeople in Canada